Coleophora marcarolensis is a moth of the family Coleophoridae. It is found in Italy.

The larvae feed on Genista pilosa. They feed on the generative organs of their host plant.

References

marcarolensis
Moths described in 2004
Moths of Europe